Heniocha dyops, the marbled emperor, is a moth of the family Saturniidae. It is found in Angola, Kenya, Namibia, South Africa and Tanzania.

The larvae feed on Acacia mearnsii, Acacia burkei, Acacia hereroensis, Acacia karroo, Acacia mellifera and Acacia nigrescens.

References

Moths described in 1872
Saturniinae
Moths of Africa
Insects of Namibia
Insects of Angola
Insects of Tanzania